Golden Elixir Press is an independent publisher of books and occasional papers on Taoism and Taoist Internal Alchemy (Neidan). The press was founded in 2009. As of March 2019, it had published about two dozen works, some of which are concerned with other traditions, such as Hinduism, Buddhism, and Sufism.

According to an interview with the press founder, originally published in the Silent Tao website, the intended audience of Golden Elixir Press is "everyone who is interested for any reason in the doctrines of the Way of the Golden Elixir". Although the books published by the press are mainly addressed to the general public, they have also been well-received by the academic community.

Publications of Golden Elixir Press include translations of some of the main texts of Taoist Internal Alchemy: the Cantong qi (Seal of the Unity of the Three), the Wuzhen pian (Awakening to Reality), and the Yinfu jing (Book of the Hidden Agreement).

The press is closely related to Fabrizio Pregadio, a scholar who, in addition to his academic research, publishes translations of original Chinese texts addressed to a wider audience.

Notes

External links 

 Golden Elixir Press.

Taoist texts
Chinese alchemy